Linn Boyd (November 22, 1800 – December 17, 1859) (also spelled "Lynn") was a prominent US politician of the 1840s and 1850s, and served as Speaker of the United States House of Representatives from 1851 to 1855. Boyd was elected to the House as a Jacksonian from Kentucky from 1835 to 1837 and again as a Democrat from 1839 to 1855, serving seven terms in the House. Boyd County, Kentucky is named in his honor.

Early and family life

Born to the wife of part-time delegate Abraham Boyd in Trigg County, he was raised and educated to some minimal extent in Trigg County.
In 1832, Boyd married fellow Trigg County native Alice C. Bennett. In 1850, the widower married a widow from Pennsylvania, Anna L. Dixon.

Early career

Boyd moved to Calloway County to farm in 1826. The next year he became Calloway County's delegate in the Kentucky House of Representatives, and served alongside his father (who represented Trigg County) in 1828–1829. In 1831 Boyd moved back to Trigg County and its voters elected him to represent them in the state House.

U.S. Congressman

In 1833, Boyd lost his first campaign for the United States House of Representatives. In 1835 he was elected to the House and served there until 1837, when a Whig landslide resulting from the Panic of 1837 cost him his seat.

Kentucky voters of the First Congressional District soon returned Boyd to the House, and he would serve from 1839 through 1855. He was a strong supporter of President Andrew Jackson. Boyd played a key role in maneuvering the annexation of Texas through Congress during the term of President John Tyler in 1845. Boyd was also important in getting the Compromise of 1850, chiefly credited to Henry Clay, passed through Congress. Largely though his prominence in shepherding the compromise to passage, Boyd was elected Speaker of the House in 1851 and held that office until 1855.

While in the House, he sufficiently impressed his colleague Charles S. Benton that he named his son, the future inventor and businessman Linn Boyd Benton, after him.

Later career
Boyd was nominated for Governor of Kentucky in 1848, but declined to run and was replaced by Lazarus W. Powell. In 1852 he moved to Paducah.  He was mentioned as a candidate for Vice President of the United States at the 1856 Democratic National Convention, but was never officially nominated; the eventual nominee was fellow Kentuckian John C. Breckinridge.

Kentucky voters elected Boyd the 16th Lieutenant Governor of Kentucky in 1859, but he died shortly thereafter. This became significant with the onset of the Civil War. Governor Beriah Magoffin, who supported slavery, secession and states' rights, became increasingly unpopular and distrusted as Kentucky sought to maintain a neutral course between the Union and the Confederate States of America. Unionists held a two-thirds majority in both houses of the Kentucky General Assembly in summer 1861 and frequently overrode Magoffin's vetoes. By August 1862 Magoffin made it clear that he was willing to resign the governorship. However, due to Linn Boyd's death, the person next in line to become Governor of Kentucky was Speaker of the Senate John F. Fisk, whom Magoffin thought unacceptable. After Fisk resigned as Speaker and was replaced by James F. Robinson, Magoffin resigned. Thus, Robinson became governor and Fisk was reinstalled as Speaker of the Senate.

Death and burial
Boyd died in Paducah on December 17, 1859. He was buried at Paducah's Oak Grove Cemetery. Oaklands, a spacious brick home he had built in Paducah in 1852, no longer exists except as a street name.

References

1800 births
1859 deaths
Politicians from Nashville, Tennessee
Speakers of the United States House of Representatives
Jacksonian members of the United States House of Representatives from Kentucky
Democratic Party members of the United States House of Representatives from Kentucky
Lieutenant Governors of Kentucky
Democratic Party members of the Kentucky House of Representatives
Farmers from Kentucky